Rijk Zwaan Zaadteelt en Zaadhandel B.V. is a Dutch vegetable breeding and seed production company headquartered in De Lier in the province of South Holland. With a market share of 9%, Rijk Zwaan is the number four vegetable breeding company worldwide. The family-owned company breeds over 25 different types of vegetables, including lettuce, tomato, cucumber, bell pepper and cabbage.

History

Foundation and growth
The founder of the company, Mr Rijk Zwaan, came from a family of seed growers and seed traders living in the Dutch town of Enkhuizen, which evolved into a centre for the seed production industry in the late nineteenth century. In 1924 Zwaan opened a shop selling seeds on the street called Zwaanshals in Rotterdam. In order to select plants himself and hence gain more control over the seed quality, he arranged for his own seed production and breeding facilities to be built in Bergschenhoek in 1932. In the period following the Second World War, there was explosive growth in the horticulture sector. Westland, Zwaan's key sales area in the west of the Netherlands, became an important region for the production of vegetables in greenhouses. The company grew rapidly in the second half of the 20th century and the headquarters were moved to De Lier in Westland in 1970. In 1964 the first foreign subsidiary was set up, in Germany. From 1980 onwards the international market became increasingly important for the company and the number of facilities outside the Netherlands grew.

Management buyout
In 1986 the Zwaan family decided to sell their shares in the company to BP Nutrition because of a lack of successor within the family. BP Nutrition invested in Rijk Zwaan for the first two years, but the multinational then changed its strategy and put the organisation up for sale in 1989. The board of directors, employees and even customers vigorously opposed sale of the business to parties that wanted to dismantle or merge the breeding company. They wanted the company to remain intact and independent. With financial support from employees and the Cebeco-Handelsraad agricultural and horticultural cooperative, the board of directors succeeded in buying the company from BP Nutrition.

Since the 1990s, the company's progress has been characterised by internationalisation and new technology. In 1989 the organisation became a shareholder in biotechnology company KeyGene. In 2004 the breeding company set up a second research facility in Fijnaart. Since 1989, Zwaan has opened an average of one new facility a year outside of the Netherlands.

Products

The Rijk Zwaan product portfolio mainly comprises fruit vegetables, leafy crops, root crops and cabbage types. Varieties of said crops are selected based on traits including flavour and texture, consistency, production value and health and nutritional values. The company breeds vegetables and sells the seeds produced from them.

Developing new varieties
The breeding of vegetable varieties is focused on crossing plants with usable traits and selecting the best offspring. To do this, the breeders make use of the diversity that nature has to offer in combination with market knowledge and modern technology. Much of the research in vegetable breeding is aimed at selecting offspring more precisely and working more efficiently. This facilitates the faster development of varieties with the traits demanded by the vegetable chain (growers, processors, traders and consumers) such as resistances. The growing conditions and sales markets for vegetables differ widely around the world, which makes it necessary to develop varieties that are specifically suitable for particular local production conditions and market situations. Rijk Zwaan does not develop varieties that are governed by regulations for genetically modified organisms (GMOs).

Seed production and logistics
Vegetable seeds are a natural product. They must be produced under ideal conditions and quality control is essential. The seeds that Rijk Zwaan produces around the world are shipped to the Netherlands for cleaning and checks of their purity, variety authenticity, seedborne diseases and germination vigour. Some seeds are also subjected to extra treatment, such as encapsulation - to make them easier to sow - or a coating against germination diseases.

Support and sales
The company sells seeds and shares its knowledge with customers. To assess whether crops are suitable for local conditions, the varieties are trialled in practice by growers around the world. By sharing knowledge about production techniques and product sales, Rijk Zwaan helps growers to improve their yields. This is especially the case for small, local growers in countries where vegetable production is still in its infancy. When advising growers, Rijk Zwaan collaborates with governments, NGOs and other (local) partners. The company also exchanges information with other partners in the vegetable chain, such as retailers, food manufacturing companies, vegetable processing companies and restaurants.

References

Companies based in South Holland